Agriculture in Turkey is an important part of the economy, and is the responsibility of the Ministry of Agriculture and Forestry.

Half of the land is agricultural, employing 18% of the workforce, and providing 10% of exports, and 7% of GDP in 2020. There are half a million farmers. Turkey is a major producer of wheat, sugar beets, milk, poultry, cotton, tomatoes, and other fruits and vegetables.

, Turkey is the world's largest producer of hazelnuts and apricots. In 2021, Turkey received 65 percent of all imported wheat from Russia and more than 13 percent from Ukraine.

Turkish agriculture emits greenhouse gases. According to the World Bank the sector should adapt more to climate change in Turkey and make technical improvements. 14% of food was lost during agricultural processing in 2016, and 23% was trashed by consumers before eating and 5% as leftovers.

The livestock industry, compared to the initial years of the Republic, showed little improvement in productivity, and the later years of the decade saw stagnation. Almost all the seeds used in Turkey are produced domestically.

Turkey is the EU's fourth largest non-EU vegetable supplier and the seventh largest fruit supplier. The European Commission had already started the formal process for extending the Customs Union Agreement to agricultural products, before European Union–Turkey relations deteriorated and efforts to extend and modernize the Customs Union Agreement came to a halt in 2018.

History

Historically, Turkey's farmers have been fairly fragmented. The government initiated many projects, such as the Southeastern Anatolia Project.

Crops

Cereals 
In 2021 the country was almost self-sufficient in cereals.

Fruit and veg 
Greenhouses have a competitive advantage over EU ones due to lower costs, and tropical fruit can be grown.

Avocado cultivation in Turkey has shown significant improvement in recent years. In addition, banana cultivation in the Mediterranean region of Turkey has an important potential.

Grapes 

Turkey's total grape production was 4,264,720 tonnes in 2009, 4,255,000 tonnes in 2010, 4,296,351 tonnes in 2011, and 4,275,659 tonnes in 2012, ranking sixth in the world in all four years, according to FAO data.

Olives 
There are almost 200 million trees and Turkey produces about 200 thousand tonnes of olive oil a year. Edremit (Ayvalık) is the main variety in northern Turkey and Memecik in the south. Gemlik is a black table olive and many other varieties are grown.

Livestock
The main forage crops are alfalfa, silage corn, oats, vetch, and sainfoin. Native cattle breeds such as Anatolian Black cattle are low yielding but hardy.

Fish farms

Farmers 
 agricultural statistics need improvement according to the EU. Although there are over 2 million people on the Agriculture Ministry's Farmer Registration System, only half a million are known to the Social Security Institution. Many farms are small and family farms are common, with many women working informally. It has been claimed that with the influx of Syrian refugees seasonal agricultural work became more precarious, especially for women and children. Kurdish seasonal workers are also poor. The ILO is helping to stop child labour. The FAO has various projects.

Research and environment 
Seeds and bulbs are stored long term. The World Bank has a project. In the first 2 decades of the 21st century farming is thought not to have been sustainable.

Agrivoltaics generally gives higher crop yields in water-stressed sunny regions.

Trade and economics 
In 2020 the country receiving the most exports was Iraq and that sending the most food to Turkey was Russia.  The EU intends to support rural development with €430 million during 2021-2027.  Total Factor Productivity is estimated to have decreased by 2% annually on average from 2005 to 2016.

Gübretaş and Hektaş are large fertiliser companies.

Irrigation 
Sometimes solar power is used to pump water to combat drought.

References

External links

Agriculture in Turkey